Melania Maria Sinoracka (13 June 1923 – 28 February 1975) was a Polish javelin thrower. She competed at the 1948 Olympics and placed 11th.

Sinoracka was born in a working family, and in 1937 began working as a saleswoman for the Toruń Railway. After World War II she was moved to the State Railways Directorate in Toruń and stayed there until 1950. In 1950–1952 she worked at a factory of water meters, and in 1952–1957 at a garment factory.

Sinoracka took up gymnastics in 1937 and changed to athletics in 1938. She won the Polish javelin title in 1947 and 1948; she was also successful in the shot put and played volleyball at the national level.

References

Polish female javelin throwers
Polish female shot putters
1923 births
1975 deaths
Olympic athletes of Poland
Athletes (track and field) at the 1948 Summer Olympics
Sportspeople from Toruń
20th-century Polish women